This article records new taxa of plants that are scheduled to be described during the year 2018, as well as other significant discoveries and events related to paleobotany that occurred in the year 2018.

Flowering plants
{| class="wikitable sortable" align="center" width="100%"
|-
! Name
! Novelty
! Status
! Authors
! Age
! Unit
! Location
! Notes
! Images
|-
|
Alloberberis axelrodii
|
Sp. nov
|
Valid
|
Doweld
|
Miocene
|
|
()
|
A member of the family Berberidaceae; a replacement name for the previously invalidly published Mahonia sinuata Axelrod (1985), lacking holotype designation when published.
|
|-
|
Alloberberis caeruleomontana
|
Nom. nov
|
Valid
|
Doweld
|
Miocene
|
|
()
|
A member of the family Berberidaceae; a replacement name for Ilex sinuata Chaney & Axelrod (1959).
|
|-
|
Anacolosidites eosenonicus
|
Sp. nov
|
Valid
|
Arai & Dias-Brito
|
Late Cretaceous (Santonian)
|
São Carlos Formation
|

|
A pollen taxon, possibly a member of the family Loranthaceae.
|
|-
|
Aniba caucasica
|
Nom. nov
|
Valid
|
Doweld
|
Pliocene
|
|
Abkhazia
|
A species of Aniba; a replacement name for Aniba longifolia Kolakovsky & Schakryl (1958).
|
|-
|
Anisodromum upchurchii
|
Sp. nov
|
Valid
|
Wang & Dilcher
|
Early Cretaceous (Albian)
|
Dakota Formation
|
()
|
A rosid described on the basis of fossil leaves.
|
|-
|
Annona nepalensis
|
Sp. nov
|
Valid
|
Prasad et al.
|
Miocene
|
Churia Formation
|

|
A species of Annona.
|
|-
|
Araliaephyllum popovii
|
Sp. nov
|
Valid
|
Golovneva
|
Early Cretaceous (Albian)
|
|

|
A member of Laurales described on the basis of fossil leaves.
|
|-
|
Archeampelos betulifolia
|
Sp. nov
|
Valid
|
Moiseeva, Kodrul & Herman
|
Paleocene
|
Zeya–Bureya Basin
|

|
A flowering plant described on the basis of fossil leaves, similar to leaves of members of the family Betulaceae.
|
|-
|
Austrovideira
|
Gen. et sp. nov
|
Valid
|
Rozefelds & Pace
|
Early Oligocene
|
|

|
A member of Vitaceae. Genus includes new species A. dettmannae.
|
|-
|
Berberis miopannonica
|
Nom. nov
|
Valid
|
Doweld
|
Miocene
|
|

|
A species of Berberis; a replacement name for Berberis lanceolata Givulescu (1985).
|
|-
|
Berberis notata
|
Nom. nov
|
Valid
|
Doweld
|
Miocene
|
|

|
A species of Berberis; a replacement name for Ilex ambigua Unger (1847) and Berberis ambigua Kovar-Eder & Kvaček (2004).
|
|-
|
Berryoxylon
|
Gen. et sp. nov
|
Valid
|
Awasthi, Mehrotra & Shukla
|
Late Miocene–early Pliocene
|
Cuddalore Sandstone Formation
|

|
A fossil wood showing affinities with members of the genus Berrya. Genus includes new species B. cuddalorensis.
|
|-
|
Bignonioxylon
|
Gen. et sp. nov
|
Valid
|
Moya & Brea
|
Late Pleistocene
|
Arroyo Feliciano Formation
|

|
A member of Bignoniaceae described on the basis of fossil wood. Genus includes new species B. americanum.
|
|-
|
Burretiodendron guangxiensis
|
Sp. nov
|
Valid
|
Dong & Sun in Dong et al.
|
Oligocene
|
Ningming Formation
|

|
A species of Burretiodendron.
|
|-
|
Buxus pliosinica
|
Sp. nov
|
Valid
|
Huang, Su & Zhou
|
Late Pliocene
|
Sanying Formation
|

|
A species of Buxus.
|
|-
|
Canarium guangxiensis
|
Sp. nov
|
Valid
|
Han & Manchester in Han et al.
|
Late Oligocene to late Miocene
|
Erzitang Formation
Foluo Formation
Yongning Formation
|

|
A species of Canarium
|
|-
|
Carlquistoxylon australe
|
Sp. nov
|
Valid
|
Pujana et al.
|
Early Cretaceous (late Albian)
|
Cerro Barcino Formation
|

|
A flowering plant of uncertain phylogenetic placement, described on the basis of fossil wood.
|
|-
|
Castanopsis guangxiensis
|
Sp. nov
|
Valid
|
Huang et al.
|
Late Oligocene
|
Yongning Formation
|

|
A species of Castanopsis.
|
|-
|
Castanopsis nanningensis
|
Sp. nov
|
Valid
|
Huang et al.
|
Late Oligocene
|
Yongning Formation
|

|
A species of Castanopsis.
|
|-
|
Chenocybus
|
Gen. et sp. nov
| 
Valid
|
Poinar
|
Late Cretaceous (Cenomanian)
|
Burmese amber
|

|
A flowering plant of uncertain phylogenetic placement. Genus includes new species C. allodapus.
|
|-
|
Chisochetonoxylon vastanensis
|
Sp. nov
|
Valid
|
Shukla & Mehrota
|
Early Eocene
|
Cambay Shale Formation
|

|
A member of the family Meliaceae described on the basis of fossil wood.
|
|-
|
Cladium transdnestrovicum
|
Nom. nov
|
Valid
|
Doweld
|
Miocene (Serravallian)
|
|
Transnistria
|
A species of Cladium; a replacement name for Cladium crassum Negru (1972), preoccupied by extant C. crassum (Thwaites) Kükenthal.
|
|-
|
Clerodendrum sarmatiacum
|
Nom. nov
|
Valid
|
Doweld
|
Miocene
|
|
()
|
A species of Clerodendrum; a replacement name for Clerodendrum ovalifolium Baikovskaja in Kryshtofovich & Baikovskaja (1965).
|
|-
|
Cobbania pharao
|
Sp. nov
|
Valid
|
Coiffard & Mohr
|
Late Cretaceous (Campanian)
|
Quseir Formation
|

|
A member of the family Araceae belonging or related to the subfamily Aroideae.
|
|-
|
Concavistylon
|
Gen. et 2 sp. nov
|
Valid
|
Manchester, Pigg & Devore
|
Early Eocene to Middle Miocene
|
Little Butte Volcanic Series
|
()
|
A Trochodendraceae genus. Type species C. kvacekii Manchester, Pigg & Devore (2018) from Oregon C. wehrii Manchester et al. (2018) from Washington state and British Columbia was originally described as a second species of this genus, but subsequently it was transferred to the separate genus Paraconcavistylon.
|
|-
|
Craspedodromophyllum boguchanicum
|
Sp. nov
|
Valid
|
Moiseeva, Kodrul & Herman
|
Paleocene
|
Zeya–Bureya Basin
|

|
A member of the family Betulaceae.
|
|-
|
Cretaceoxylon
|
Gen. et sp. nov
|
Valid
|
Pujana in Pujana et al.
|
Late Cretaceous (Campanian)
|
Santa Marta Formation
|
Antarctica(James Ross Island)
|
A eudicot of uncertain phylogenetic placement, described on the basis of fossil wood. Genus includes new species C. heteropunctatum.
|
|-
|
Cryptocaryoxylon lemnium
|
Sp. nov
|
Valid
|
Mantzouka
|
Early Miocene
|
|

|
A member of the family Lauraceae.
|
|-
|
Cryptocaryoxylon lesbium
|
Sp. nov
|
Valid
|
Mantzouka
|
Early Miocene
|
|

|
A member of the family Lauraceae.
|
|-
|
Cussoniophyllum
|
Nom. nov
|
Valid
|
Doweld
|
Late Cretaceous (Cenomanian)
|
|

|
A flowering plant described on the basis of fossil leaves; a replacement name for the invalidly published Cussoniphyllum Velenovský (1889). Genus includes "Cussonia" partita Velenovský (1882).
|
|-
|
Cyperus maii
|
Nom. nov
|
Valid
|
Doweld
|
Miocene
|
|

|
A species of Cyperus; a replacement name for Dichostylis macrocarpa Mai (1987).
|
|-
|
Cyperus waltheri
|
Nom. nov
|
Valid
|
Doweld
|
Miocene
|
|

|
A species of Cyperus; a replacement name for Dichostylis minor Mai in Mai & Walther (1991).
|
|-
|
Dakotanthus
|
Gen. et comb. nov
|
Valid
|
Manchester et al.
|
Cretaceous (late Albian to Cenomanian)
|
Dakota Formation
Woodbine Formation
|
()
|
An early eudicot; a new genus for "Carpites" cordiformis Lesquereux (1892).
|
|-
|
Dalbergioxylon biseriatensis
|
Sp. nov
|
Valid
|
Cheng et al.
|
Pliocene
|
Yuanmou Basin
|

|
A member of the family Fabaceae described on the basis of fossil wood.
|
|-
|
Diaphoranthus
|
Gen. et sp. nov
| 
Junior homonym
|
Poinar
|
Late Cretaceous (Cenomanian)
|
Burmese amber
|

|
A flowering plant of uncertain phylogenetic placement. Genus includes new species D. burmensis. The generic name is preoccupied by Diaphoranthus Meyen (1834); Poinar (2019) coined a replacement name Exalloanthum.
|
|-
|
Dicotylophyllum skogii
|
Sp. nov
|
Valid
|
Wang & Dilcher
|
Early Cretaceous (Albian)
|
Dakota Formation
|
()
|
A flowering plant of uncertain phylogenetic placement, described on the basis of fossil leaves.
|
|-
|
Dioscorites palauensis
|
Sp. nov
|
Valid
|
Guzmán-Vázquez, Calvillo-Canadell & Sánchez-Beristain
|
Late Cretaceous
|
Olmos Formation
|

|
A member of the family Dioscoreaceae.
|
|-
|
Diplosophyllum
|
Nom. nov
|
Valid
|
Doweld
|
Late Cretaceous (Cenomanian)
|
|

|
A flowering plant described on the basis of fossil leaves; a replacement name for the preoccupied Diplophyllum Velenovský & Viniklář (1929). Genus includes "Inga" cottae Ettingshausen (1867), "Diplophyllum" cretaceum Velenovský & Viniklář (1929), "Hymenaea" elongata Velenovský (1884), "Hymenaea" inaequalis Velenovský (1884) and "Hymenaea" primigenia de Saporta in Velenovský (1884).
|
|-
|
Dipterocarpuspollenites cretacea
|
Sp. nov
|
Valid
|
Prasad et al.
|
Late Cretaceous (Maastrichtian)
|
|

|
A pollen taxon belonging to the family Dipterocarpaceae.
|
|-
|
Donlesia cheyennensis
|
Sp. nov
|
Valid
|
Wang & Dilcher
|
Early Cretaceous (Albian)
|
Cheyenne Sandstone
|
()
|
A member of the family Ceratophyllaceae.
|
|-
|
Ebenoxylon cuddalorensis
|
Sp. nov
|
Valid
|
Awasthi, Mehrotra & Shukla
|
Late Miocene–early Pliocene
|
Cuddalore Sandstone Formation
|

|
A fossil wood showing affinities with members of the family Ebenaceae.
|
|-
|
Edencarpa
|
Gen. et sp. nov
|
Valid
|
Atkinson, Stockey & Rothwell
|
Late Cretaceous (early Coniacian)
|
|
()
|
A member of Cornales. Genus includes new species E. grandis.
|
|-
|
Endobeuthos
|
Gen. et sp. nov
|
Valid
|
Poinar & Chambers
|
Late Cretaceous (Cenomanian)
|
Burmese amber
|

|
A flowering plant of uncertain phylogenetic placement, possibly a relative of members of the family Dilleniaceae. Genus includes new species E. paleosum.
|
|-
|
Eucalyptoxylon cuddalorensis
|
Sp. nov
|
Valid
|
Awasthi, Mehrotra & Shukla
|
Late Miocene–early Pliocene
|
Cuddalore Sandstone Formation
|

|
A fossil wood showing affinities with members of the genus Eucalyptus.
|
|-
|
Euphorbia pontiana
|
Nom. nov
|
Valid
|
Doweld
|
Miocene
|
|

|
A species of Euphorbia; a replacement name for Euphorbia cylindrica Negru (1979).
|
|-
|
Eydeia vancouverensis
|
Sp. nov
|
Valid
|
Atkinson, Stockey & Rothwell
|
Late Cretaceous (early Coniacian)
|
|
()
|
A member of Cornales.
|
|-
|
Ficophyllum angustifolium
|
Nom. nov
|
Valid
|
Doweld
|
Late Cretaceous (Campanian)
|
|

|
A replacement name for Ficus angustifolia Hosius (1869).  
|
|-
|
Ficophyllum antiquum
|
Nom. nov
|
Valid
|
Doweld
|
Late Cretaceous (Campanian)
|
|

|
A replacement name for Ficus crassinervis Hosius (1869).  
|
|-
|
Ficophyllum hosii
|
Nom. nov
|
Valid
|
Doweld
|
Late Cretaceous (Santonian)
|
|

|
A replacement name for Ficus laurifolia Hosius & Marck (1880).  
|
|-
|
Ficophyllum magnolioides
|
Nom. nov
|
Valid
|
Doweld
|
Early Cretaceous (Albian)
|
Dakota Formation
|
()
|
A replacement name for Ficus magnoliifolia Lesquereux (1883).  
|
|-
|
Ficophyllum marckii
|
Nom. nov
|
Valid
|
Doweld
|
Late Cretaceous (Campanian)
|
|

|
A replacement name for Ficus elongata Hosius (1869).  
|
|-
|
Ficus aenigmatica
|
Nom. nov
|
Valid
|
Doweld
|
Eocene
|
Wilcox Formation
|
()
|
A species of Ficus; a replacement name for Ficus schimperi Lesquereux (1868).  
|
|-
|
Ficus microtrivia
|
Sp. nov
|
Valid
|
Huang & Zhou in Huang et al.
|
Miocene
|
Wenshan Basin
|

|
A species of Ficus.
|
|-
|
Ficus myrtoides
|
Nom. nov
|
Valid
|
Doweld
|
Eocene
|
|
()
|
A species of Ficus; a replacement name for Ficus myrtifolius Berry (1916).  
|
|-
|
Ficus slovenica
|
Nom. nov
|
Valid
|
Doweld
|
Eocene
|
|

|
A species of Ficus; a replacement name for Ficus pilosa Ettingshausen (1872).  
|
|-
|
Ficus venustoides
|
Nom. nov
|
Valid
|
Doweld
|
Oligocene (Chattian)
|
|

|
A species of Ficus; a replacement name for Ficus venusta Saporta (1861).  
|
|-
|
Ficus venustula
|
Nom. nov
|
Valid
|
Doweld
|
Eocene
|
|

|
A species of Ficus; a replacement name for Malpighiastrum venustum Unger (1860).  
|
|-
|
Ficus yellowstonica
|
Nom. nov
|
Valid
|
Doweld
|
Paleocene
|
|
()
|
A species of Ficus; a replacement name for Ficus densifolia Knowlton (1899).  
|
|-
|
Fissistigma nanningense
|
Sp. nov
|
Valid
|
Li et al.
|
Oligocene
|
Yongning Formation
|

|
A species of Fissistigma.
|
|-
|
Gardenia eocenicus
|
Sp. nov
|
Valid
|
Shukla, Mehrotra & Nawaz Ali
|
Early Eocene
|
Palana Formation
|

|
A species of Gardenia.
|
|-
|
Gastonispermum
|
Gen. et sp. nov
|
Valid
|
Friis, Crane & Pedersen
|
Early Cretaceous
|
|

|
A flowering plant with affinities to Austrobaileyales or Nymphaeales. Genus includes new species G. portugallicum.
|
|-
|
Gleditsioxylon jiangsuensis
|
Sp. nov
|
Valid
|
Cheng et al.
|
Early Miocene
|
|

|
A member of Leguminosae described on the basis of fossil wood.
|
|-
|
Gmelina siwalika
|
Sp. nov
|
Valid
|
Khan, Bera & Bera in Khan et al.'
|
Late Pliocene or early Pleistocene
|
Kimin Formation
|

|
A species of Gmelina.
|
|-
|Goniothalamus miocenicus|
Sp. nov
|
Valid
|
Prasad et al.|
Late Miocene
|
Middle Churia Formation
|

|
A species of Goniothalamus.
|
|-
|Gouania miocenica|
Sp. nov
|
Valid
|
Hernandez-Hernández & Castañeda-Posadas
|
Early Miocene
|
Mexican amber
|

|
A species of Gouania.
|
|-
|Hederago|
Nom. nov
|
Valid
|
Doweld
|
Late Cretaceous (Cenomanian)
|
|

|
A flowering plant described on the basis of fossil leaves; a replacement name for the invalidly published Hederophyllum Velenovský (1889). Genus includes "Hedera" credneriifolia Velenovský (1882) and "Hedera" primordialis de Saporta (1879).
|
|-
|Hemitrapa alpina|
Sp. nov
|
Valid
|
Su & Zhou in Su et al.|
Early Oligocene
|
|

|
A member of the family Lythraceae. Originally described as a species of Hemitrapa, but subsequently transferred to the genus Primotrapa by Li et al. (2020).
|
|-
|Hibiscus sarmatiacus|
Sp. nov
|
Valid
|
Doweld
|
Miocene
|
|
()
|
A species of Hibiscus; a replacement name for the invalidly named Hibiscus splendens Baikovskaja.
|
|-
|Holigarna palaeograhamii|
Sp. nov
|
Valid
|
Shukla, Mehrotra & Nawaz Ali
|
Early Eocene
|
Palana Formation
|

|
A species of Holigarna.
|
|-
|Hopenium tertiarum|
Sp. nov
|
Valid
|
Awasthi, Mehrotra & Shukla
|
Late Miocene–early Pliocene
|
Cuddalore Sandstone Formation
|

|
A fossil wood showing affinities with members of the genus Hopea.
|
|-
|Ipomoea meghalayensis|
Sp. nov
|
Valid
|
Srivastava, Mehrotra & Dilcher
|
Paleocene (Thanetian)
|
|

|
A species of Ipomoea.
|
|-
|Kirchheimeria|
Gen. et comb. nov
|
Valid
|
Kowalski in Kowalski & Worobiec
|
Oligocene to Pliocene
|
|

()
|
A member of Ericaceae of uncertain phylogenetic placement. Genus includes "Elaeocarpus" globulus Menzel (1906).
|
|-
|Kvacekispermum|
Gen. et sp. nov
|
Valid
|
Friis, Crane & Pedersen
|
Early Cretaceous
|
Figueira da Foz Formation
|

|
A member of the family Chloranthaceae. Genus includes new species K. rugosum.
|
|-
|Lachnociona camptostylus|
Sp. nov
|
Valid
|
Poinar & Chambers
|
Late Cretaceous (Cenomanian)
|
Burmese amber
|

|
A flowering plant of uncertain phylogenetic placement, most similar to members of the families Brunelliaceae and Cunoniaceae.
|
|-
|Lacinipetalum|
Gen. et sp. nov
|
Valid
|
Jud et al.|
Paleocene (early Danian)
|
Upper Salamanca Formation
|

|
A member of Cunoniaceae. Genus includes new species L. spectabilum.
|
|-
|Laurinoxylon rennerae|
Sp. nov
|
Valid
|
Estrada-Ruiz et al.|
Late Cretaceous (late Campanian)
|
McRae Formation
|
()
|
A member of Lauraceae described on the basis of fossil wood.
|
|-
|Laurus ficoides|
Nom. nov
|
Valid
|
Doweld
|
Eocene
|
|

|
A species of Laurus; a replacement name for Ficus reticulata Saporta (1863).  
|
|-
|Lefipania|
Gen. et sp. nov
|
Valid
|
Martínez, Gandolfo & Cúneo
|
Late Cretaceous (Maastrichtian)
|
Lefipán Formation
|

|
A flowering plant of uncertain phylogenetic placement, described on the basis of fossil leaves. Genus includes new species L. padillae.
|
|-
|Leguminocarpum oguruiensis|
Sp. nov
|
Valid
|
Yabe & Nakagawa
|
Miocene
|
Shimo Formation
|

|
A fossil legume fruit.
|
|-
|Ligustrum miovulgare|
Sp. nov
|
Valid
|
Doweld
|
Miocene
|
|
()
|
A species of Ligustrum; a replacement name for the invalidly named Ligustrum vulgare var. fossilis Baikovskaja.
|
|-
|Lijinganthus|
Gen. et sp. nov
|
Valid
|
Liu et al.|
Late Cretaceous (Cenomanian)
|
Burmese amber
|

|
A member of Pentapetalae of uncertain phylogenetic placement. Genus includes new species L. revoluta.
|
|-
|Limnobiophyllum stockeyana|
Sp. nov
|
Valid
|
Coiffard & Mohr
|
Late Cretaceous (Campanian)
|
Quseir Formation
|

|
A member of the family Araceae belonging to the subfamily Lemnoideae.
|
|-
|Liquidambar fujianensis|
Sp. nov
|
Valid
|
Dong et al.|
Middle Miocene
|
Fotan Group
|

|
A species of Liquidambar.
|
|-
|Lithocarpoxylon microporosum|
Sp. nov
|
Valid
|
Cheng et al.|
Pliocene
|
Yuanmou Basin
|

|
A member of the family Fagaceae described on the basis of fossil wood.
|
|-
|Lithocarpoxylon nanningensis|
Sp. nov
|
Valid
|
Huang et al.|
Late Oligocene
|
Yongning Formation
|

|
A member of Fagaceae described on the basis of fossil wood.
|
|-
|Litseoxylon|
Gen. et sp. nov
|
Valid
|
Huang et al.|
Late Oligocene
|
Yongning Formation
|

|
A member of the family Lauraceae. Genus includes new species L. nanningensis.
|
|-
|Luckowcarpa|
Gen. et sp. nov
|
Valid
|
Martínez
|
Late Eocene
|
Esmeraldas Formation
|

|
A member of Fabaceae belonging to the group Dalbergieae. Genus includes new species L. gunnii.
|
|-
|Lusitanispermum|
Gen. et sp. nov
|
Valid
|
Friis, Crane & Pedersen
|
Early Cretaceous
|
|

|
A flowering plant with affinities to Austrobaileyales or Nymphaeales. Genus includes new species L. choffatii.
|
|-
|Lycopus europleistocenicus|
Sp. nov
|
Valid
|
Doweld
|
Pleistocene
|
|

|
A species of Lycopus; a replacement name for the invalidly named Lycopus intermedius Dorofeev (1963).
|
|-
|Malus antiqua|
Nom. nov
|
Valid
|
Doweld
|
Miocene
|
|

|
A species of Malus; a replacement name for Malus pulcherrima Givulescu (1980).
|
|-
|Maytenoxylon|
Gen. et sp. nov
|
Valid
|
Franco
|
Late Cenozoic
|
Ituzaingó Formation
|

|
A member of Celastraceae described on the basis of fossil wood. Genus includes new species M. perforatum.
|
|-
|Mcraeoxylon|
Gen. et sp. nov
|
Valid
|
Estrada-Ruiz et al.|
Late Cretaceous (late Campanian)
|
McRae Formation
|
()
|
A flowering plant described on the basis of fossil wood, with a suite of features seen in several families of Malpighiales, Myrtales and Oxalidales. Genus includes new species M. waddellii.
|
|-
|Meliosma antiqua|
Nom. nov
|
Valid
|
Doweld
|
Oligocene
|
|

|
A species of Meliosma; a replacement name for Calvarinus reticulatus Reid & Reid (1910).
|
|-
|Menispermites calderensis|
Sp. nov
|
Valid
|
Jud et al.|
Eocene (Ypresian)
|
Huitrera Formation
|

|
A member of the family Menispermaceae described on the basis of fossil leaves.
|
|-
|Menispermites olmosensis|
Sp. nov
|
Valid
|
Guzmán-Vázquez, Calvillo-Canadell & Sánchez-Beristain
|
Late Cretaceous
|
Olmos Formation
|

|
A member of the family Menispermaceae.
|
|-
|Nelumbo jiayinensis|
Sp. nov
|
Valid
|
Liang et al.|
Late Cretaceous (Santonian)
|
Yong'ancun Formation
|

|
A species of Nelumbo.
|
|-
|Neofructus|
Gen. et sp. nov
|
Valid
|
Liu & Wang
|
Early Cretaceous (Barremian–Aptian)
|
Yixian Formation
|

|
An early flowering plant. Genus includes new species N. lingyuanensis.
|
|-
|Nitaspermum|
Gen. et 5 sp. nov
|
Valid
|
Friis, Crane & Pedersen
|
Early Cretaceous (Albian)
|
Potomac Group
|
()
|
A fossil seed with affinities to Austrobaileyales and Nymphaeales. Genus includes new species N. taylorii, N. hopewellense, N. crassum, N. virginiense and N. marylandense.
|
|-
|Nyssa givulescui|
Nom. nov
|
Valid
|
Doweld
|
Oligocene
|
|

|
A tupelo; a replacement name for Nyssa maxima Givulescu, Petrescu & Barbu (1997).
|
|-
|Obamacarpa|
Gen. et sp. nov
|
Valid
|
Atkinson, Stockey & Rothwell
|
Late Cretaceous (early Coniacian)
|
|
()
|
A member of Cornales. Genus includes new species O. edenensis.
|
|-
|Ocotea undulatoides|
Nom. nov
|
Valid
|
Doweld
|
Miocene
|
|

|
A species of Ocotea; a replacement name for Laurophyllum undulatum Weyland & Kilpper (1963).
|
|-
|Paisia|
Gen. et sp. nov
|
Valid
|
Friis, Mendes & Pedersen
|
Early Cretaceous (late Barremian–early Albian)
|
Almargem Formation
|

|
An early eudicot. Genus includes new species P. pantoporata.
|
|-
|Palaeocarya huashanensis|
Sp. nov
|
Valid
|
Chen et al.|
Oligocene
|
Ningming Formation
|

|
A member of the family Juglandaceae.
|
|-
|Paleoallium|
Gen. et sp. nov
|
Valid
|
Pigg, Bryan & DeVore
|
Early Eocene
|
Klondike Mountain Formation
|
()
|
A monocot similar to members of Amaryllidaceae. Genus includes new species P. billgenseli.
|

|-
|Paliurus hirsuta|
Sp. nov
|
Valid
|
Dong & Sun in Dong et al.|
Middle Miocene
|
Fotan Group
|

|
A species of Paliurus.
|
|-
|Palmoxylon araneus|
Sp. nov
|
Valid
|
Nour-El-Deen, El-Saadawi & Thomas
|
Oligocene (Rupelian)
|
Jebel Qatrani Formation
|

|
|
|-
|Palmoxylon elsaadawii|
Sp. nov
|
Valid
|
Nour-El-Deen & Thomas in Nour-El-Deen, Thomas & El-Saadawi
|
Oligocene (Rupelian)
|
Jebel Qatrani Formation
|

|
|
|-
|Palmoxylon qatraniense|
Sp. nov
|
Valid
|
Nour-El-Deen, El-Saadawi & Thomas
|
Oligocene (Rupelian)
|
Jebel Qatrani Formation
|

|
|
|-
|Paraalbizioxylon sinica|
Sp. nov
|
Valid
|
Cheng et al.|
Pliocene
|
Yuanmou Basin
|

|
A member of the family Fabaceae described on the basis of fossil wood.
|
|-
|Paraalbizioxylon yunnanensis|
Sp. nov
|
Valid
|
Cheng et al.|
Pliocene
|
Yuanmou Basin
|

|
A member of the family Fabaceae described on the basis of fossil wood.
|
|-
|Parahancornioxylon|
Gen. et comb. nov
|
Valid
|
Moya, Brea & Lutz
|
Pliocene
|
Andalhualá Formation
|

|
A member of Apocynaceae described on the basis of fossil wood; a new genus for "Menendoxylon" piptadiensis Lutz (1987).
|
|-
|Paraphyllanthoxylon antarcticum|
Sp. nov
|
Valid
|
Pujana in Pujana et al.|
Late Cretaceous (Campanian)
|
Santa Marta Formation
|
Antarctica(James Ross Island)
|
A flowering plant of uncertain phylogenetic placement, described on the basis of fossil wood.
|
|-
|Pazlia|
Gen. et sp. nov
|
Valid
|
Friis, Crane & Pedersen
|
Early Cretaceous
|
|

|
A flowering plant with affinities to Austrobaileyales or Nymphaeales. Genus includes new species P. hilaris.
|
|-
|Pazliopsis|
Gen. et sp. nov
|
Valid
|
Friis, Crane & Pedersen
|
Early Cretaceous
|
Almargem Formation
|

|
A flowering plant with affinities to Austrobaileyales or Nymphaeales. Genus includes new species P. reyi.
|
|-
|Pentacentron|
Gen. et sp. nov
|
Valid
|
Manchester et al.|
Eocene
|
|
()
|
A member of the family Trochodendraceae. Genus includes new species P. sternhartae.
|
|-
|Photinia sarmatiaca|
Sp. nov
|
Valid
|
Doweld
|
Miocene
|
|
()
|
A species of Photinia; a replacement name for the invalidly named Photinia acuminata Baikovskaja in Kryshtofovich & Baikovskaja (1965).
|
|-
|Pistacia miolentiscus|
Nom. nov
|
Valid
|
Doweld
|
Miocene
|
|

|
A species of Pistacia; a replacement name for Pistacia lentiscoides Andreánszky & Cziffery in Andreánszky (1959).
|
|-
|Pistacia pliolentiscus|
Nom. nov
|
Valid
|
Doweld
|
Pliocene
|
|

|
A species of Pistacia; a replacement name for Pistacia acuminata Reid & Reid (1915).
|
|-
|Pistacioxylon ufuki|
Sp. nov
|
Valid
|
Akkemik & Poole in Akkemik et al.|
Early Miocene
|
Haymana Basin
|

|
A Pistacia-like plant described on the basis of fossil wood.
|
|-
|Polyalthioxylon arunachalensis|
Sp. nov
|
Valid
|
Srivastava, Mehrotra & Srikarni
|
Late Pliocene–Early Pleistocene
|
Kimin Formation
|

|
A member of the family Annonaceae described on the basis of fossil wood.
|
|-
|Priscophyllum|
Nom. nov
|
Valid
|
Doweld
|
Late Cretaceous (Cenomanian)
|
|

|
A flowering plant described on the basis of fossil leaves; a replacement name for the invalidly published Grevilleophyllum Velenovský (1889). Genus includes "Grevillea" constans Velenovský (1883).
|
|-
|Prunus hirsutipetala|
Sp. nov
|
Valid
|
Sokoloff, Remizowa & Nuraliev in Sokoloff  et al.|
Eocene
|
Rovno amber
|

|
A species of Prunus.
|
|-
|Pseudoanacardium|
Gen. et comb. nov
|
Valid
|
Manchester & Balmaki
|
Early Oligocene
|
|

|
A fossil fruit of uncertain phylogenetic placement; a new genus for "Anacardium" peruvianum Berry (1924).
|
|-
|Pseudolimnobiophyllum|
Gen. et sp. nov
|
Valid
|
Coiffard & Mohr
|
Late Cretaceous (Campanian)
|
Quseir Formation
|

|
A member of the family Araceae belonging to the subfamily Lemnoideae. Genus includes new species P. simile.
|
|-
|Pseudowinterapollis agatdalensis|
Sp. nov
|
Valid
|
Grímsson & Zetter in Grímsson et al.|
Paleocene (Danian)
|
Agatdal Formation
|

|
A pollen taxon, a member of the family Winteraceae.
|
|-
|Pterocaryoxylon huxii|
Sp. nov
|
Valid
|
Cheng et al.|
Pliocene
|
Yuanmou Basin
|

|
A member of the family Juglandaceae described on the basis of fossil wood.
|
|-
|Pterygota eocenica|
Sp. nov
|
Valid
|
Shukla, Mehrotra & Nawaz Ali
|
Early Eocene
|
Palana Formation
|

|
A species of Pterygota.
|
|-
|Ranunculus eoreptans|
Nom. nov
|
Valid
|
Doweld
|
Pliocene
|
|

|
A species of Ranunculus; a replacement name for Ranunculus pusillus Dorofeev (1987).
|
|-
|Retiacolpites pigafettaensis|
Sp. nov
|
Valid
|
Prasad et al.|
Late Cretaceous (Maastrichtian)
|
|

|
A pollen taxon resembling pollen of members of the genus Pigafetta.
|
|-
|Reyispermum|
Gen. et sp. nov
|
Valid
|
Friis, Crane & Pedersen
|
Early Cretaceous
|
Figueira da Foz Formation
|

|
A flowering plant with affinities to Austrobaileyales or Nymphaeales. Genus includes new species R. parvum.
|
|-
|Rhododendron maii|
Nom. nov
|
Valid
|
Doweld
|
Pliocene
|
|

|
A species of Rhododendron; a replacement name for Rhododendron germanicum Mai & Walther (1988).
|
|-
|Rightcania|
Gen. et sp. nov
|
Valid
|
Friis, Crane & Pedersen
|
Early Cretaceous (Albian)
|
Potomac Group
|
()
|
A member of the family Chloranthaceae. Genus includes new species R. kvacekii.
|
|-
|Ripogonum palaeozeylandiae|
Sp. nov
|
Valid
|
Conran, Kennedy & Bannister
|
Early Eocene
|
|

|
A species of Ripogonum.
|
|-
|Ruprechtioxylon breae|
Sp. nov
|
Valid
|
Franco
|
Late Cenozoic
|
Ituzaingó Formation
|

|
A member of Polygonaceae described on the basis of fossil wood.
|
|-
|Ryparosa churiaensis|
Sp. nov
|
Valid
|
Prasad et al.|
Miocene
|
Churia Formation
|

|
A species of Ryparosa.
|
|-
|Salacia lombardii|
Sp. nov
|
Valid
|
Hernández-Damián, Gómez-Acevedo & Cevallos-Ferriz
|
Miocene
|
|

|
A species of Salacia.
|
|-
|Sambucus sarmatiaca|
Sp. nov
|
Valid
|
Doweld
|
Miocene
|
|
()
|
A species of Sambucus; a replacement name for the invalidly named Sambucus palaeoracemosa Baikovskaja in Kryshtofovich & Baikovskaja (1965).
|
|-
|Sapindopsis retallackii|
Sp. nov
|
Valid
|
Wang & Dilcher
|
Early Cretaceous (Albian)
|
Dakota Formation
|
()
|
A member or a relative of the family Platanaceae described on the basis of fossil leaves.
|
|-
|Schoenoplectiella isolepioides|
Sp. nov
|
Valid
|
Doweld
|
Pliocene
|
|

|
A member of the family Cyperaceae; a replacement name for the invalidly named Scirpus (Schoenoplectus) isolepioides Mai & Walther (1988).
|
|-
|Scirpus novorossicus|
Nom. nov
|
Valid
|
Doweld
|
Miocene (Tortonian)
|
|

|
A species of Scirpus; a replacement name for Scirpus leptocarpus Negru (1986), preoccupied by extant Scirpus leptocarpus Mueller (1855).
|
|-
|Setitheca|
Gen. et sp. nov
|
Valid
|
Poinar & Chambers
|
Late Cretaceous (Cenomanian)
|
Burmese amber
|

|
A member of Laurales of uncertain phylogenetic placement. Genus includes new species S. lativalva.
|
|-
|Silutanispermum|
Gen. et sp. nov
|
Valid
|
Friis, Crane & Pedersen
|
Early Cretaceous
|
|

|
A flowering plant with affinities to Austrobaileyales or Nymphaeales. Genus includes new species S. kvacekiorum.
|
|-
|Sloanea siwalika|
Sp. nov
|
Valid
|
More et al.|
Pliocene
|
Geabdat Sandstone Formation
|

|
A species of Sloanea.
|
|-
|Soepadmoa|
Gen. et sp. nov
|
Valid
|
Nixon, Crepet, Gandolfo & Grimaldi
|
Late Cretaceous (Turonian)
|
Raritan Formation(New Jersey amber)
|
()
|
A member of Fagales of uncertain phylogenetic placement. Genus includes new species S. cupulata.
|
|-
|Staphylea spinosa|
Sp. nov
|
Valid
|
Huang & Momohara in Huang, Momohara & Wang
|
Pleistocene
|
Shobudani Formation
|

|
A species of Staphylea.
|
|-
|Stafylioxylon|
Gen. et comb. nov
|
Valid
|
Rozefelds & Pace
|
Eocene
|
London Clay
|

|
A member of Vitaceae; a new genus for "Vitaceoxylon" ramunculiformis Poole & Wilkinson (2000).
|
|-
|Stellatia|
Gen. et comb. nov
|
Valid
|
Arai & Dias-Brito
|
Late Cretaceous (Santonian)
|
São Carlos Formation
|

|
A phytoclast, possibly a member of Nymphaeaceae. Genus includes S. furcata (Duarte & Arai, 2010).
|
|-
|Stephania auriformis|
Comb nov
|
valid
|
(Hollick) Manchester & Han
|
Hollick
|
Paleocene/Eocene
|
"King Salmon Lake flora"
|

|
A moonseed species. Moved from Diploclisia auriformis (1994) 
|
|-
|Stephania jacquesii|
Sp. nov
|
Valid
|
Han & Manchester in Han et al.|
Late Eocene to late Oligocene
|
Clarno Formation
Yongning Formation
|

()
|
A species of Stephania.
|
|-
|Stephania psittaca|
Sp. nov
|
Valid
|
Jud & Gandolfo in Jud et al.|
Paleocene (Danian)
|
Salamanca Formation
|

|
A species of Stephania.
|
|-
|Stephania wilfii|
Sp. nov
|
Valid
|
Han & Manchester in Han et al.|
Paleocene to Eocene
|
Green River Formation
|
()
|
A species of Stephania.
|
|-
|Sterculia acerina|
Nom. nov
|
Valid
|
Doweld
|
Eocene
|
|

|
A species of Sterculia; a replacement name for Acer crassinervium Ettingshausen (1869).
|
|-
|Symplocos hitchcockii|
Sp. nov
|
Valid
|
Tiffney, Manchester & Fritsch
|
Early Miocene
|
Brandon Lignite
|
()
|
A species of Symplocos.
|
|-
|Syzygium christophelii|
Sp. nov
|
Valid
|
Tarran et al.|
Early Miocene
|
|

|
A species of Syzygium.
|
|-
|Syzygium gurhaensis|
Sp. nov
|
Valid
|
Shukla, Mehrotra & Nawaz Ali
|
Early Eocene
|
Palana Formation
|

|
A species of Syzygium.
|
|-
|Tanispermum|
Gen. et 4 sp. nov
|
Valid
|
Friis, Crane & Pedersen
|
Early Cretaceous (early Aptian to early to middle Albian)
|
Potomac Group
|
()
|
A flowering plant with affinities to Austrobaileyales or Nymphaeales. Genus includes new species T. hopewellense, T. marylandense, T. drewriense and T. antiquum.
|
|-
|Teuschestanthes|
Gen. et sp. nov
|
Valid
|
Crepet, Nixon & Weeks
|
Late Cretaceous (Turonian)
|
Lower Magothy Formation
|
()
|
A member of Ericales of uncertain phylogenetic placement. Genus includes new species T. squamata.
|
|-
|Trichomites|
Gen. et 3 sp. nov
|
Valid
|
Arai & Dias-Brito
|
Late Cretaceous (Santonian)
|
São Carlos Formation
|

|
A phytoclast. Genus includes new species T. brevifurcatus (probably a member of Campanulaceae), T. duplihelicoidus (affinity unknown) and T. simplex (a dicotyledon of uncertain affinity).
|
|-
|Tricolpites joelcastroi|
Sp. nov
|
Valid
|
Arai & Dias-Brito
|
Late Cretaceous (Santonian)
|
São Carlos Formation
|

|
A pollen taxon, an indeterminate dicotyledon.
|
|-
|Trochodendroides sittensis|
Sp. nov
|
Valid
|
Golovneva in Golovneva & Zolina
|
Early Cretaceous
|
|

|
Taxon described on the basis of fossil leaves resembling leaves of members of the family Cercidiphyllaceae.
|
|-
|Trochodendron postnastae|
Sp. nov
|
Valid
|
Manchester, Pigg & Devore
|
Middle Miocene
|
Little Butte Volcanic Series
|
()
|
A species of Trochodendron.
|
|-
|Trochodendron rosayi|
Sp. nov
|
Valid
|
Manchester, Pigg & Devore
|
Middle Miocene
|
Little Butte Volcanic Series
|
()
|
A species of Trochodendron.
|
|-
|Turneroxylon|
Gen. et sp. nov
|
Valid
|
Estrada-Ruiz et al.|
Late Cretaceous (late Campanian)
|
McRae Formation
|
()
|
A eudicot with similarities to members of Dilleniaceae, described on the basis of fossil wood. Genus includes new species T. newmexicoense.
|
|-
|Ulmus maguanensis|
Sp. nov
|
Valid
|
Zhang & Xing in Zhang et al.|
Miocene
|
Huazhige Formation
|

|
An elm.
|
|-
|Ulmus prelanceaefolia|
Sp. nov
|
Valid
|
Zhang & Xing in Zhang et al.|
Miocene
|
Huazhige Formation
|

|
An elm.
|
|-
|Ulmus priamurica|
Sp. nov
|
Valid
|
Blokhina & Bondarenko
|
Miocene
|
Sazanka Formation
|
()
|
An elm.
|
|-
|Unona miocenica|
Sp. nov
|
Valid
|
Prasad et al.|
Miocene
|
Churia Formation
|

|
A member of the family Annonaceae.
|
|-
|Viburnum pliolantana|
Nom. nov
|
Valid
|
Doweld
|
Pliocene
|
|
()
|
A species of Viburnum; a replacement name for Viburnum lantanoides Dorofeev (1977).
|
|-
|Weinmannioxylon trichospermoides|
Sp. nov
|
Valid
|
Pujana in Pujana et al.|
Late Cretaceous (Campanian)
|
Santa Marta Formation
|
Antarctica(James Ross Island)
|
A member of Cunoniaceae described on the basis of fossil wood.
|
|-
|Wilkinsoniphyllum|
Gen. et sp. nov
|
Valid
|
Jud et al.|
Paleocene (Danian)
|
Salamanca Formation
|

|
A member of the family Menispermaceae described on the basis of fossil leaves. Genus includes new species W. menispermoides.
|
|-
|Wingia|
Gen. et comb. nov
|
Valid
|
Wang & Dilcher
|
Early Cretaceous (Albian)
|
Dakota Formation
|
()
|
A flowering plant of uncertain phylogenetic placement, described on the basis of fossil leaves. Genus includes "Dicotylophyllum" expansolobum Upchurch & Dilcher (1990).
|
|-
|Zanthoxylum pilari|
Nom. nov
|
Valid
|
Doweld
|
Miocene
|
|

|
A species of Zanthoxylum; a replacement name for Zanthoxylum affine Pilar (1883).
|
|-
|Zanthoxylum tethyca|
Nom. nov
|
Valid
|
Doweld
|
Eocene
|
|

|
A species of Zanthoxylum; a replacement name for Rutaspermum rugosum Chandler (1964).
|
|-
|Zelkovoxylon yesimae|
Sp. nov
|
Valid
|
Akkemik & Poole in Akkemik et al.|
Early Miocene
|
Haymana Basin
|

|
A Zelkova-like plant described on the basis of fossil wood.
|
|-
|Zygogynum poratus|
Sp. nov
|
Valid
|
Liang & Zhou in Liang et al.|
Middle Miocene
|
|

|
A species of Zygogynum.
|
|-
|}

Pinales

Other seed plants

Other plants

General research
 A study attempting to establish a timescale of early land plant evolution is published by Morris et al. (2018).
 Assemblage of putative Ordovician (Hirnantian) land plants is described from the Zbrza locality in the southern Świętokrzyskie Mountains (Poland) by Salamon et al. (2018).
 A study on the structure and variation of areolation patterns in leaves of Paleozoic protosphagnalean mosses is published by Ivanov, Maslova & Ignatov (2018).
 A study on the phylogenetic relationships of the Cretaceous mosses Meantoinea alophosioides and Eopolytrichum antiquum within Polytrichaceae is published by Bippus, Escapa & Tomescu (2018).
 Meristems of rooting axes belonging to Asteroxylon mackiei are described from the Rhynie chert (United Kingdom) by Hetherington & Dolan (2018).
 A study re-examining the evidence on the speed of growth and life cycle of the tree-like lycophytes from the Carboniferous (Pennsylvanian) coal swamps, and in particular addressing an earlier study by Boyce & DiMichele (2016), is published by Thomas & Cleal (2018).
 A study on the impact of increased ultraviolet irradation (caused by volcanism-induced ozone shield deterioration) on plants during the Permian–Triassic extinction event is published by Benca, Duijnstee & Looy (2018).
 A study on the composition of the Late Triassic flora of the American Southwest, based on palynological data from the Chinle Formation, and indicative of a floral turnover occurring in the middle Norian, is published by Baranyi et al. (2018).
 A study on the Middle Jurassic flora from Yorkshire (United Kingdom) as indicated by pollen and spores, and on the possible dinosaur-plant interactions in the area is published by Slater et al. (2018).
 Occurrence of the characean genus Tolypella is reported from the Lower Cretaceous of the Garraf Massif (Catalonia, Spain) by Martín-Closas et al. (2018), representing the oldest known record of the genus reported so far.
 A study on the spore wall structure and development in Psilophyton dawsonii is published by Noetinger, Strayer & Tomescu (2018).
 Lycopsid megaspores preserved with fossil starch, probably used to attract and reward animals for megaspore dispersal, are described from the Permian of north China by Liu et al. (2018).
 A study on the phylogenetic relationships of extant and fossil members of Equisetales is published by Elgorriaga et al. (2018).
 A study on the anatomy of the Devonian fern-like plant Shougangia bella is published by Wang et al. (2018).
 A study on the phylogenetic relationships of a putative Triassic fern Pekinopteris, based on evaluation of specimens preserving fertile pinnae, is published by Axsmith, Skog & Pott (2018).
 A study on the anatomical structure of Coniopteris hymenophylloides (a fossil fern belonging to the family Dicksoniaceae) based on well-preserved materials from the Middle Jurassic Yaojie Formation (China), including sterile and fertile pinnae, sporangia and in situ spores, epidermal cuticles and stomatal complexes, is published by Xin et al. (2018).
 A study on the phylogenetic relationships of extant and fossil marattialean ferns is published by Rothwell, Millay & Stockey (2018).
 A study on the phylogenetic relationships of members of Dipteridaceae based on data from extant and fossil taxa is published by Choo & Escapa (2018).
 A study on the phylogenetic relationships of early seed plants, aneurophytalean progymnosperms, Stenokoleales and several Devonian plants of uncertain affinities is published by Toledo, Bippus & Tomescu (2018).
 Plant fossils representing the genera Glossopteris, Vertebraria, Samaropsis, Paracalamites, Sphenophyllum and Dichotomopteris are described from the Permian strata in the Tabbowa Basin of Sri Lanka by Edirisooriya, Dharmagunawardhane & McLoughlin (2018), thus being the first representatives of the distinctive Permian Glossopteris flora reported from that country.
 Fossils of member of the genus Glossopteris related to the species Glossopteris communis from India are described from the Permian deposits of southeastern Gobi (Mongolia) by Naugolnykh & Uranbileg (2018).
 A study on the fossils of glossopterids from the Permian (Lopingian) Buckley Formation (Antarctica) will be published by DeWitt et al. (2018), who present evidence of glossopterids shedding their pollen organs during a different time of the season than Glossopteris leaves.
 Blomenkemper et al. (2018) report the discovery of mixed plant-fossil assemblages in Late Permian deposits on the margins of the Dead Sea in Jordan, including fossils of seed ferns, members of Bennettitales and the earliest records of conifers reported so far.
 A study on the phylogeny of conifers, comparing the inferred phylogenetic relationships and estimated divergence ages with the paleobotanical record, is published by Leslie et al. (2018).
 A study on the atmospheric carbon dioxide concentration levels in the Early Cretaceous based on data from specimens of the fossil conifer species Pseudofrenelopsis papillosa is published by Jing & Bainian (2018).
 A study on the phylogenetic relationships of members of Pinaceae based on data from extant and fossil taxa is published by Gernandt et al. (2018).
 A study on the epidermis of the leaves of the fossil pine Pinus mikii and on the phylogenetic relationships of the species is published by Yamada & Yamada (2018).
 A study on the anatomy and phylogenetic relationships of Austrohamia acanthobractea, based on data from leafy twigs with attached pollen cones and seed cones from the Middle Jurassic Daohugou Lagerstätte (China), is published by Dong et al. (2018).
 Rediscovery of the holotype specimen of Weltrichia fabrei is reported by Moreau & Thévenard (2018).
 Revision of gymnosperm species known from the Eocene Baltic amber is published by Alekseev (2018).
 A study on the phylogenetic relationships of the vascular plants and the timescale of their evolution, attempting to establish when the flowering plants originated, is published by Barba-Montoya et al. (2018).
 A study on the early evolution of Chloranthaceae, focusing on the phylogenetic relationships of the Cretaceous taxa Canrightiopsis and Pseudoasterophyllites, is published by Doyle & Endress (2018).
 Fossil assemblage including plant and vertebrate remains is described from the Turonian Ferron Sandstone Member of the Mancos Shale Formation (Utah, United States) by Jud et al. (2018), who report turtle and crocodilian remains and an ornithopod sacrum, as well as a large silicified log assigned to the genus Paraphyllanthoxylon, representing the largest known pre-Campanian flowering plant reported so far and the earliest documented occurrence of an angiosperm tree more than 1.0 m in diameter.
 A study on the phylogenetic relationships of extant and fossil members of Zingiberales is published by Smith et al. (2018).
 A study on the phylogenetic relationships of Cornales based on data from extant and fossil taxa is published by Atkinson (2018).
 A study on the microstructure of the fossils assigned to the genus Operculifructus, and on its implications for inferring the phylogenetic relationships of this genus, is published by Hayes et al. (2018).
 A study on the phylogenetic relationships of the flowering plants and Gnetales, as indicated by morphological data from extant and fossil taxa, is published by Coiro, Chomicki & Doyle (2018).
 Revision of the taxonomy of the Cretaceous monocot genus Viracarpon is published by Matsunaga et al. (2018), who transfer the species Coahuilocarpon phytolaccoides known from the Campanian Cerro del Pueblo Formation (Mexico) to the genus Viracarpon, thus rejecting the hypothesis that Viracarpon was endemic to India.
 Microfossil remains of early grasses extracted from a specimen of the Early Cretaceous dinosaur species Equijubus normani from China are described by Wu, You & Li (2018).
 Cantisolanum daturoides from the Eocene London Clay Formation, previously suggested to be a member of the family Solanaceae, is reinterpreted as more likely to be a commelinid monocot by Särkinen et al. (2018).
 A study on the lower threshold of extant palm temperature tolerance, as well as on the potential of using the presence of palm fossils to infer past climate, is published by Reichgelt, West & Greenwood (2018).
 A study on the human use of rainforest plant resources of prehistoric Sri Lanka, as indicated by data from phytoliths from the Fahien Rock Shelter sediments, is published by Premathilake & Hunt (2018).
 A study on the occurrence of bananas in the archaeological sequence at Fahien Rock Shelter (south‐west Sri Lanka), as indicated by seed and leaf phytolith evidence, is published by Premathilake & Hunt (2018).
 A study on the macroevolutionary dynamics of extinction and adaptation of palms with megafaunal fruits in the late Cenozoic is published by Onstein et al. (2018), who interpret their findings as indicating that progressive loss of megafaunal frugivores during the late Cenozoic likely resulted in increased extinction rates of palms with megafaunal fruits.
 A study on the floral and fruit morphology of the early eudicot species Ranunculaecarpus quinquecarpellatus is published by Manchester et al. (2018).
 A study on the principal morphological characters distinguishing shade and sun leaves in modern species of Liquidambar, and on their implications for identifying leaf polymorphisms in fossil members of this genus that could otherwise be used to establish unwarranted new species, is published by Maslova et al. (2018).
 A study on fossil pollen of members of the group Ericales from five Eocene localities in the United Kingdom, Austria, Germany and China, aiming to describe fossil pollen types and compare them with the most similar looking pollen of modern species, is published by Hofmann (2018).
 A new fossil Loranthaceae pollen type (the first representative of this family in the fossil record of Africa) is described from the earliest Miocene of Saldanha Bay (South Africa) by Grímsson et al. (2018).
 A study on the types of fossil oak pollen grains from the Last Glacial Maximum sediments from the northern South China Sea, and on their implications for inferring regional climatic conditions in this area during the Last Glacial Maximum, is published by Dai, Hao & Mao (2018).
 A pistillate partial inflorescence of a member of the genus Castanopsis is described from Baltic amber by Sadowski, Hammel & Denk (2018), representing the first record of this genus from Baltic amber and the first pistillate inflorescence of Fagaceae from Eurasia reported so far.
 A study on factors which influenced the diversification processes and diversity dynamics of Cenozoic woody flowering plants is published by Shiono et al. (2018).
 Description of plant remains and palynomorphs preserved in the coprolites produced by large dicynodonts from the Triassic Chañares Formation (Argentina), and a study on the affinities of the plants preserved in those coprolites, is published by Perez Loinaze et al. (2018).
 A study on the nutritional value of plants grown under elevated CO2 levels, evaluating the hypothesis that constraints on sauropod diet quality were driven by Mesozoic CO2 concentration, is published by Gill et al. (2018).
 A study on the diversity, frequency and representation of insect damage of fossil plant specimens from the Permian La Golondrina Formation (Argentina) is published by Cariglino (2018).
 A study on the insect herbivory on fossil ginkgoalean and bennettitalean leaves from the Middle Jurassic Daohugou Beds (China), and on defenses of these plants against insect herbivory, is published by Na et al. (2018).
 Diverse gymnosperm and angiosperm fossils, displaying affinities with the flora of the Araripe Basin (Santana Formation) as well as those identified in deposits from the North America (Potomac Group), are described from the Lower Cretaceous Codó Formation (Brazil) by Lindoso et al. (2018).
 A study on the impact of the Cenomanian-Turonian boundary event on the continental flora, as indicated by spore-pollen fossil record, is published by Heimhofer et al. (2018).
 Insect and plant inclusions are reported from amber from the uppermost Campanian Kabaw Formation of Tilin (Myanmar) by Zheng et al. (2018).
 Grimaldi et al. (2018) report biological inclusions (fungi, plants, arachnids and insects) in amber from the Paleogene Chickaloon Formation of Alaska, representing the northernmost deposit of fossiliferous amber from the Cenozoic.
 Organically preserved plant fossils, including leaves with cuticular preservation, are described from the Paleogene Ligorio Márquez Formation (Argentina) by Carpenter, Iglesias & Wilf (2018).
 A study on changes in Eocene plant diversity and floristic composition at Messel (Germany) is published by Lenz & Wilde (2018).
 An amber layer is reported from the lower part of the Dingqing Formation (late Oligocene) in Lunpola of central Tibet (representing the first record of amber from Tibet) by Wang et al. (2018), who interpret this amber as derived from dipterocarp trees, and who interpret the amber layer as remains of the northernmost dipterocarp forest discovered so far.
 A study on CO2 concentrations during the early Miocene, as indicated by stomatal characteristics of fossil leaves from a late early Miocene assemblage from Panama and a leaf gas‐exchange model, is published by Londoño et al. (2018).
 A study evaluating when the plants using the C4 photosynthetic pathway initially expanded on the Australian continent, as indicated by carbon isotope ratios of plant waxes from scientific ocean drilling sediments off north‐western Australia, is published by Andrae et al. (2018).
 A study on the role of fire during the expansion of C4 grassland ecosystems in the Mio-Pliocene, based on data from molecular proxies from paleosol samples of the Siwalik Group (Pakistan), is published by Karp, Behrensmeyer & Freeman (2018).
 A study on the macroevolutionary responses of noctuid moths from the group Sesamiina and their associated host-grasses to environmental changes during the Neogene is published by Kergoat et al. (2018).
 A study on the abundance of the C3 and C4 grasses in the central interior of southern Africa in the Early Pleistocene, as indicated by enamel stable carbon and oxygen isotope data, associated faunal abundance and phytolith evidence from the site of Wonderwerk Cave (South Africa), is published by Ecker et al. (2018).
 A study on the changes of vegetation in the temperate zone of Asia during an interval containing the Mid-Pleistocene Transition, ~1.2–0.7 million years ago, as indicated by pollen data from a drilling core from the North China Plain, as well as on their effect on the large mammal fauna is published by Xinying et al. (2018).
 A study on the use of plants by early modern humans during the Middle Stone Age as indicated by analyses of phytoliths from the Pinnacle Point locality (South Africa) is published by Esteban et al. (2018).
 A study on the distance of seed dispersal by extant and extinct mammalian frugivores and on the impact of the extinction of Pleistocene megafauna on seed dispersal is published by Pires et al. (2018).
 A study evaluating how mega‐herbivore animal species controlled plant community composition and nutrient cycling, relative to other factors during and after the Late Quaternary extinction event in Great Britain and Ireland, is published by Jeffers et al. (2018).
 A study on the seeds preserved in moa coprolites is published by Carpenter et al. (2018), who question the hypothesis that some of the largest-seeded plants of New Zealand were dispersed by moas.
 A study on the plant–insect interactions in the European forest plant communities in the Upper Pliocene Lagerstätte of Willershausen (Lower Saxony, Germany), the Upper Pliocene locality of Berga (Thuringia, Germany) and the Pleistocene locality of Bernasso (France) is published by Adroit et al. (2018).
 A study on pollen recovered from hyaena coprolites from Vanguard Cave (Gibraltar), and on its implications for reconstructing the vegetation landscapes in the environment inhabited by southern Iberian Neanderthals during the MIS 3, is published by Carrión et al. (2018).
 A study on the inner structure of cuticles and carbonaceous compressions of Early Jurassic plants from Argentinian Patagonia, using Focused Ion Beam Scanning Electron Microscopy, is published by Sender et al. (2018).
 A study on the changing ecology of woodland vegetation of southern mainland Greece during the late Pleistocene and the early-mid Holocene, and on the ecological context of the first introduction of crop domesticates in the southern Greek mainland, as indicated by data from carbonized fuel wood waste from the Franchthi Cave, is published by Asouti, Ntinou & Kabukcu (2018).
 Evidence of plant domestication and food production from the early and middle Holocene site of Teotonio (southwestern Amazonia, Brazil) is presented by Watling et al. (2018).
 A study on changes in plant pathogen communities (fungi and oomycetes) in response to changing climate during late Quaternary, as indicated by data from solidified deposits of rodent coprolites and nesting material from the central Atacama Desert spanning the last ca. 49,000 years, is published by Wood et al. (2018).
 A study on the timing of the origination of the East Asian flora (including Sino-Japanese Flora Metasequoia Flora and Sino-Himalayan Rhododendron Flora), as indicated by molecular and fossil data, is published by Chen et al.'' (2018).

References

2018 in paleontology
Paleobotany
2018 in science